Stainmore may refer to:
Stainmore, a remote geographic area and civil parish in the Pennines near the borders of Cumbria, County Durham and North Yorkshire.
North Stainmore, a village in the civil parish of Stainmore, Cumbria
South Stainmore, a village in Stainmore, Cumbria
Stainmore Railway, properly known as the South Durham and Lancashire Union Railway
Stainmore Railway Company, an organisation attempting to restore the former Stainmore Railway
Stainmore Summit, highest point on the Stainmore Railway
Battle of Stainmore a battle fought in 954AD in Westmoreland, England
Brough, Cumbria also known as Brough under Stainmore

See also
Stanmore